Rajesh Ramesh (born 2 July 1982) is a Pakistani cricketer who has played first-class cricket for Karachi cricket teams and the Public Works Department. A right-handed batsman and a right-arm pace bowler, Ramesh played in 67 first-class matches.

References

Pakistani Hindus
1982 births
Sindhi people
Living people
Cricketers from Karachi
Pakistani cricketers
Karachi Blues cricketers
Karachi Whites cricketers
Public Works Department cricketers
Sindh cricketers
Karachi Urban cricketers
Sui Southern Gas Company cricketers
Karachi Dolphins cricketers
Karachi Zebras cricketers
Defence Housing Authority cricketers